At educational institutions above primary education, each grade level or year of study is a class, referenced by the year of graduation, i.e., "Class of 2011". The official activities of these groups are generally organized and led by class officers, who are elected in the late spring of each year for the term beginning in the fall, or early in the fall term. After graduation, the class officers are typically responsible for organizing their class reunion.

Composition
Like a student council, their leadership model is loosely based on either the parliamentary system or the executive branch of the United States. Unlike a student council, which represents the students of an entire school, class officers typically represent only a single class. Whereas the purpose of student council is to learn about democracy and leadership, and to work in partnership with school management for the benefit of the school, the goal of class officers is to organize and facilitate activities for the enjoyment of their classmates.
The following positions are common to nearly all groups of class officers:

 Class president - ultimately responsible for all class activities; creates agenda and presides over meetings; delegates duties and acts as the representative for the class
 Vice-president - fulfills the duties of the president when the president is absent; performs duties assigned by the president
 Secretary - takes meeting minutes; maintains correspondence & attendance records; keeps class activity calendar/webpage; responsible for all sign-up sheets   
 Treasurer - establishes budget; records all financial transactions; gives status report at class meetings; authorizes expenditures; inventories fundraising items; and collects/deposits fundraising money earned
 Historian - writes a narrative of activities and events; maintains a scrapbook of documents & memorabilia; coordinates activities with newspaper and yearbook teams; and publicizes activities

The responsibilities of the secretary and treasurer are sometimes combined into a secretary/treasurer position.
Some schools have multiple vice presidents, each responsible for an activity, such as decorating or fundraising. Typically, class officers are automatically members of the student government group at their school, but that is not their primary responsibility. After graduation, the secretary reports classmate name and address changes to the school's alumni office, and submits class news to be included in the alumni publication.

Other jobs
If the class is large or very active, other officers may be specified: 
 Sergeant at arms - maintains order and decorum at meetings.
 Fundraising officer (high school) - solicits donations from businesses, organizes activities to earn money for class needs 
 Stewardship agent (college) - solicits class members for donations to both the institution and the class's fund; promotes & implements class projects 
 Webmaster - keeps the website/webpage current
 Homecoming/Reunion chair - responsible for planning and executing associated activities
 Peace officer - maintains silence in the class.
 Public Information Officer - informs the class of any incoming activities or matters needed to be done.
 Auditor- Maintains payment records done by the treasurer in case of future usage.

The individuals who fill these positions may be selected by the other officers or elected with them.

Advisor
Institutions of secondary education typically require an adult advisor who is a faculty member. That person may volunteer for the job or be assigned by the school. Their function is to act as a liaison between the class and the administration, ensuring that the group's actions and activities conform to the policies of the institution. The advisor will work with the president when setting class meetings agendas to include all required items in a timely manner.  The advisor should also provide encouragement, direction, support and ideas when needed.

References

Student culture
Student politics